NaVorro Roderick Bowman (born May 28, 1988) is an American former professional football player who was a linebacker for eight seasons in the National Football League (NFL). He played college football for the Penn State Nittanyn Lions, and was selected by the San Francisco 49ers in the third round of the 2010 NFL Draft. He has also played a season for the Oakland Raiders.

Early years
Bowman was born in District Heights, Maryland on May 28, 1988. He started sports at a young age and was a member of District Heights boys and girls club, where he played both basketball and football and was invited to many All-star Events. Bowman was a standout player at Suitland High School in Suitland, Maryland. He missed most of his senior season with a shoulder injury, but he had a very impressive junior campaign in which he recorded 165 tackles, 9 sacks, and 3 fumble recoveries as a linebacker and ran for 1,200 yards and 22 touchdowns as a running back. He was named the Maryland Defensive Player-of-the-Year, first-team All-State, Washington Post first-team All-Met and first-team All-Conference. He was recruited to Penn State by Larry Johnson, Sr.

College career
Bowman played for the Penn State Nittany Lions football team while attending Pennsylvania State University from 2006 to 2009.

After redshirting the 2006 season, Bowman played in nine games in 2007. He missed two games due to a sprained ankle suffered in a game against Illinois. He recorded 16 tackles, with a sack, a forced fumble, a fumble recovery, a blocked kick, and a pass breakup that season.

Bowman saw increased playing time in 2008, largely due to the graduation of All-American linebacker Dan Connor and injury to presumptive starter Sean Lee. Despite the attrition, however, Bowman kept the Nittany Lions ranked in the top ten among three primary defensive categories. Individually, Bowman led the Nittany Lions in total tackles (106), solos (61), and assisted tackles (45), was second in tackles for loss (16.5) and tied for third in sacks (4.0). He also forced two fumbles, recovered a fumble, grabbed an interception and had five pass breakups.

His first start came in week four versus Temple. He recorded 11 tackles, including five tackles for loss and three sacks, a forced fumble and an interception in the 45-3 win and was named Big Ten Co-Defensive Player of the Week.

He finished the season with a heavy heart and an outstanding performance. Bowman played against Southern California in the 2009 Rose Bowl one day after his high school coach, Nick Lynch, was killed in an automobile accident in Maryland. Bowman responded by breaking the school's bowl record with five tackles for loss (minus-21 yards), and tying the Rose Bowl record set by Ohio State's Andy Katzenmoyer in the 1997 game. He also recorded his fourth sack of the season among his eight tackles (seven solo) against the Trojans. For his superb efforts against USC, Bowman was selected to ESPN.com's 2008-09 All-Bowl team, one of two Big Ten players named to the squad.

At season's end, he was named a first-team All-Big Ten selection.

Awards and honors
 Maryland Defensive PoY (2005)
 Maryland All-State (2005)
 Washington Post All-Met (2005)
 Big Ten Defensive PoW (September 20, 2008), (November 14, 2009)
 All-Big Ten (2008)

Professional career
On January 4, 2010, Bowman's mother announced his decision to forgo his final year of NCAA eligibility and enter the 2010 NFL Draft.

San Francisco 49ers

2010 season: Rookie year
On the second day of the 2010 NFL Draft, Bowman was selected in the third round with the 91st overall pick by the San Francisco 49ers. Bowman played in all 16 games in 2010, starting one in place of Patrick Willis, who was ruled out for Week 17 after undergoing a second surgery on his broken right hand. Bowman finished his rookie year with 46 tackles.

2011 season
In his second NFL season, Bowman became the starter at inside linebacker with the departure of Takeo Spikes to free agency. Starting all 16 games and playing alongside All-Pro linebacker Patrick Willis, Bowman made huge strides and finished the year with 143 tackles, two sacks, eight pass deflections, and three fumble recoveries. In addition, he was also the team leader in tackles, while finishing second in the NFL in solo tackles. With the emergence in Bowman's play, he helped a top-ranked 49ers defense set an NFL single-season record of not allowing a rushing touchdown for 14 games. The previous record was held by the 1920 Decatur Staleys, who did not allow a rushing touchdown in a 13-game season. The 49ers finished with a 13–3 record for an NFC West pennant but lost to the eventual Super Bowl champ New York Giants 17–20 in the NFC Championship Game in overtime. Although he was not voted to the Pro Bowl for his stellar season, he was named to the First-team All-Pro by the Associated Press. He was also voted No. 85 on NFL Network's Top 100 Players of 2012, which recognizes performance from the previous season.

2012 season
In the season opener against the Packers, Bowman recorded his first career interception off Aaron Rodgers.

his third season, Bowman and the 49ers appeared in Super Bowl XLVII. In the game, he had nine combined tackles as the 49ers fell to the Baltimore Ravens by a score of 31–34.

2013 season
For the third time, Bowman earned First-team All-Pro honors and was fifth in the league in tackles with 145. On December 23, 2013, live on Monday Night Football, Bowman scored the last touchdown ever at Candlestick Park, intercepting a Matt Ryan pass and returning it 89 yards for a touchdown, sending the 49ers to the playoffs for the third consecutive season. For the 2013 season, Bowman made 16 starts with 145 tackles, five sacks, two interceptions, nine passes defended, six forced fumbles, and two fumble recoveries.

Bowman and the 49ers finished the 2013 season with a 12–4 record. The 49ers defeated the Green Bay Packers 23–20 in the Wild Card round of the playoffs in which Bowman had 10 tackles, and a forced fumble. In the divisional round of the playoffs, they defeated the Carolina Panthers 23–10 behind a strong performance by Bowman, who recorded 11 tackles and 1 sack. San Francisco played the Seattle Seahawks in the NFC Championship Game, with the winner gaining the right to represent the conference in Super Bowl XLVIII. In the fourth quarter of that game, Bowman suffered a serious injury, tearing the ACL and MCL in his left knee. The 49ers went on to lose the game 23-17.

2014 season
Bowman's injury caused him to miss the entire 2014 season.

2015 season
In 2015, Bowman returned from his knee injury that had kept him out for the previous season. There was significant concern about his health going into 2015, but he started all 16 games for the 49ers. He finished the season with a career-high and league-leading 154 tackles, making his third Pro Bowl appearance and his fourth First-team All-Pro appearance. He also accounted for 2.5 sacks and two passes defensed. He was ranked 61st on the NFL Top 100 Players of 2016.

2016 season

During a Week 4 game against the Dallas Cowboys, Bowman fell down, gripping the lower back end of his left foot. MRI tests later revealed that Bowman had a torn achilles tendon, causing him to miss the rest of the 2016 season.

2017 season
In Week 5 of the 2017 season, Bowman was benched for a few series, and later voiced his displeasure with the decision from the 23–26 overtime loss to the Indianapolis Colts. On October 13, 2017, Bowman was released from the 49ers at his request after the team was unable to trade him.

Oakland Raiders
On October 16, 2017, Bowman signed a one-year, $3 million contract with the Oakland Raiders. During Week 12 against the Denver Broncos, Bowman intercepted a pass from quarterback Paxton Lynch in the end zone, giving the Raiders their first interception of the year after not having one in their first 11 weeks under defensive coordinator Ken Norton Jr. The Raiders eventually won the game by a score of 21-14.

Retirement
On June 4, 2019, Bowman announced his retirement from the NFL and retired symbolically with the 49ers.

NFL career statistics

Regular season

Postseason

"NaVorro Bowman Rule"
On the play in which he suffered his season-ending injury, Bowman stripped Seahawks' wide receiver Jermaine Kearse of the ball near the goal line, and appeared to take over possession.  However, the officials ruled the ball to be in possession of the Seahawks. Under the instant replay conditions at the time, the officials were not permitted to take a second look. On March 26, 2014, team owners approved a change that would allow the referees to review the recovery of a loose ball. A similar proposal to allow coaches to question any recovery using one of their challenges was voted down.

Personal life
Bowman graduated with a degree in crime, law, and justice.
Bowman speaks frequently by phone with former Nittany Lion linebacker LaVar Arrington. The two first met during Arrington's stint with the Washington Redskins, when Bowman was playing at nearby Suitland High School. This friendship, along with their similarity in playing styles, has earned Bowman the nickname "LaVorro".

References

External links

San Francisco 49ers bio
Penn State Nittany Lions bio

1988 births
Living people
African-American players of American football
American football linebackers
National Conference Pro Bowl players
Oakland Raiders players
Penn State Nittany Lions football players
People from District Heights, Maryland
Players of American football from Maryland
Players of American football from Washington, D.C.
San Francisco 49ers players
Sportspeople from the Washington metropolitan area
Unconferenced Pro Bowl players
21st-century African-American sportspeople
20th-century African-American people
Ed Block Courage Award recipients